"Family Scrapbook" is the final episode of the American television series Leave It to Beaver. It last aired on ABC on June 20, 1963. It was the 39th episode in the show's sixth and final season, and the 234th episode in the complete series.

Plot summary
The episode begins with June finding an old family scrapbook while housecleaning. She gathers the family together in the living room to glance through the book. Brief highlights from the series are replayed as the Cleavers reminisce over old photographs (which are stills from earlier episodes). Ken Osmond as Eddie Haskell, Rusty Stevens as Larry Mondello, Madge Blake as Mrs. Mondello, Pamela Baird as Mary Ellen Rogers, and Sue Randall as Miss Landers are seen in flashbacks from several episodes including "Beaver Gets 'Spelled", "New Neighbors", "My Brother's Girl", "The Shave", "Beaver Runs Away", "Larry Hides Out", "Teacher Comes to Dinner", and "Wally's Election". The episode ends with the teenage Cleaver boys playing with a wind-up toy and laughing like children. It is in the final episode that the viewer learns how Beaver got his nickname.

Cast and crew
"Family Scrapbook" stars Hugh Beaumont and Barbara Billingsley as archetypal suburban couple, Ward and June Cleaver. Along for the ride are Tony Dow as the couple's older son, Wally Cleaver, and Jerry Mathers as their younger son, Theodore "Beaver" Cleaver. All guest stars in the episode appear in clips from previous episodes in the series. The episode was written by the show's creators, Joe Connelly and Bob Mosher, with series star, Hugh Beaumont directing.

Significance
"Family Scrapbook" has claimed its place in television history as the first traditional primetime series finale. No other series prior to Leave It to Beaver had a special final episode except Howdy Doody in 1960 (which did not use flashbacks and was not a primetime sitcom). Most series ended with a general storyline episode, not unlike any other episode in the series.

See also
List of Leave It to Beaver episodes

References
Applebaum, Irwyn. The World According to Beaver. TV Books, 1984, 1998..
Bank, Frank. Call Me Lumpy: my Leave It To Beaver days and other wild Hollywood life . Addax, 2002.,.  
Colella, Jennifer. The Leave It to Beaver Guide to Life: wholesome wisdom from the Cleavers! Running Press, 2006.,.
Leave It to Beaver: the complete first season. Universal Studios, 2005.
Leave It to Beaver: the complete second season. Universal Studios, 2006.
Mathers, Jerry. ...And Jerry Mathers as "The Beaver". Berkley Boulevard Books, 1998.

Footnotes

External links
Leave It to Beaver, a Titles and Air Dates Guide

1963 American television episodes
Leave It to Beaver episodes
American television series finales